The 1976 Virginia Slims of Philadelphia  was a women's tennis tournament played on indoor carpet courts at the Palestra in Philadelphia, Pennsylvania in the United States that was part of the 1976 Virginia Slims World Championship Series. It was the fifth edition of the tournament and was held from March 28 through April 3, 1976. Second-seeded Evonne Goolagong Cawley won the singles title and earned $15,000 first-prize money.

Finals

Singles
 Evonne Goolagong Cawley defeated  Chris Evert 6–3, 7–6(5–3)
 It was Goolagong's 5th singles title of the year and the 67th of her career.

Doubles
 Billie Jean King /  Betty Stöve defeated  Rosie Casals /  Françoise Dürr 7–6(5–4), 6–4

Prize money

References

Virginia Slims of Philadelphia
Advanta Championships of Philadelphia
Virginia Slims of Philadelphia
Virginia Slims of Philadelphia
Virginia Slims of Philadelphia
Virginia Slims of Philadelphia